Vineeth Sreenivasan (born 1 October 1984) is an Indian playback singer, actor, film director, screenwriter, producer, lyricist, creative director and dubbing artist. He predominantly works in the Malayalam cinema. He is the son of actor and screenwriter Sreenivasan.

Early life and family
Vineeth Sreenivasan is the eldest son of Malayalam screenwriter and actor Sreenivasan and Vimala. He completed his primary education from nursery to 10th standard at Rani Jai Higher Secondary School. He graduated in mechanical engineering from KCG College of Technology, Chennai.

Career
He made his acting debut playing one of the main protagonists in the Malayalam film Cycle, which did well at the box office. He did his second movie role with his father in the movie Makante Achan.

He writes the lyrics of most of his album songs and has also directed his own music videos. 

Vineeth won the AMMA Best Male Singer Award 2008 for his songs "Mampullikkavil" and "Jillu Jillu" and also the Best Male new face of the year 2008 by Asianet, for his role in Cycle. Vineeth wrote the script and Lyrics and debuted as director for the movie Malarvadi Arts Club  with seven new young actors. He won the Asiavision award for the best debutant director for Malarvadi Arts Club. Thattathin Marayathu is the second movie in which he was the screenwriter, director and playback singer. His third movie Thira was released in 2013, in which he introduced his younger brother Dhyan Sreenivasan.

Personal life
Vineeth married Divya Narayanan on 18 October 2012, after an eight-year-long relationship since 30 March 2004. She was his junior at KCG College of Technology in Chennai. The couple had a son Vihaan Divya Vineeth on 30 June 2017 & daughter Shanaya Divya Vineeth

Awards and nominations

Filmography

Actor

Director/writer

Producer
 Aanandam (2016)
 Helen (2019)

Dubbing artist
 Note Book - Voice for Skanda Ashok
 Positive - Voice for Skanda Ashok
 Elektra - Voice for Skanda Ashok
 Malarvadi Arts Club - Voice for Geevarghese Eappen

Narrator
 2012 - Jawan of Vellimala - Narration
 2014 - Samsaaram Aarogyathinu Haanikaram - Voice over/Narration
 2019 - Adhyarathri - Voice over/Narration
 2017 - Godha -  Narration

Recurring collaborations
Editor Ranjan Abraham, music composer Shaan Rahman, cinematographer Jomon T. John, and actor Aju Varghese have worked on five movies. Sreenivasan, Nivin Pauly, and Deepak Parambol acted in three films.

Discography

As playback singer

Albums

References

External links
 
 
 
 
 
 Vineeth Sreenivasan on MSI

Living people
Indian male singers
Malayalam playback singers
Indian male film actors
Male actors from Kerala
Male actors from Kannur
Male actors in Malayalam cinema
1984 births
People from Kannur district
Malayalam film producers
Malayalam film directors
Malayalam screenwriters
21st-century Indian film directors
21st-century Indian male actors
Singers from Kerala
Film directors from Kerala
Film producers from Kerala
Screenwriters from Kerala